The Pungyang Jo clan is a Korean clan that traces its origin to Namyangju, Gyeonggi Province. According to the 2015 Korean census, the clan has 124,262 members.

Origin 
Jo Maeng (조맹, 趙孟), who was also known by the name of Ba-woo or Bau (바우, 岩), Jo Maeng was born and raised in Pungyang-hyeon (currently Songneung-ri, Jingeon-eup, Namyangju-si, Gyeonggi-do) and lived in seclusion in a rock cave at the foot of Mt. Cheonmasan.

When Wang Geon, who was conquesting Silla at that time, was defeated by the Silla army in the battle of Yeonghae (now Yeongdeok, Gyeongsangbuk-do), the unanimous answer was to borrow the wisdom of the Bawoo, who lived hiding in Pungyang-hyeon.

When Wang Geon found him, he was 70 years old at the time. From this time on, as he climbed the road to conquer Silla and achieved the unification of the three kingdoms with great ingenuity and bravery, Wang Geon, now King Taejo, gave the name Maeng to Bawoo. 

Jo Maeng was then given the position of Munhashijong (문하시중, 門下侍中) in Pyeongjangsa (평장사, 平章事). It is said that the cave in Mt. Cheonmasan in which he lived in is said to have met Wang Geon, and Hyeonseongam was built to protect him.

Jo Maeng eventually had descendants: Jo Ji-rin (조지린, 趙之藺), Jo Shin-hyeok (조신혁, 趙臣赫), and Jo Bo (조보, 趙寶). His three descendants eventually made him the progenitor of the Pungyang Jo clan.

When Pungyang-hyeon belonged to Baekje and Goguryeo, it was called Golui-no-hyeon (골의노현, 骨衣奴縣). In 757, the 16th year of King Gyeongdeok of Silla, it was changed to Hwangyang (황양, 荒壤) and became Yeonghyeon of Hanyang County (한양군, 漢陽郡). In 940, the 23rd year of King Taejo of Goryeo, the name was changed to Pungyang and belonged to Yangju County. In 1018, the 9th year of King Hyeonjong, it was transferred to Poju (포주, 抱州/抱川). In 1427, the 9th year of King Sejong of Joseon, it again belonged to Yangju. In 1980, it was incorporated into the newly established Namyangju County from Yangju County. In 1995, Migeum City and Namyangju County merged to become Namyangju.

The Pungyang Jo clan, along with the (new) Andong Kim clan and the Yeoheung Min clan, are one of the three families that brought their influence towards the end of the Joseon Dynasty.

Late Joseon Dynasty 
The clan was a prominent yangban family during Korea's late Joseon dynasty. 

Five Jongmyo scholars, and 2 Prime Ministers; Jo Hyeon-myeong and Jo In-yeong, were produced. A Crown Princess who was posthumously honored as Queen, Queen Hyosun (the wife of Crown Prince Hyojang) and another Crown Princess who was posthumously honored as Queen Dowager, Queen Sinjeong (the wife of Crown Prince Hyomyeong). 

Princess Consort Uichun (Prince Bongan’s wife) and Princess Consort Mooncheon (Prince Yangwon’s wife), as well as two Royal Consorts, Royal Consort Gwi-in (a concubine of King Yeongjo) and Royal Consort Gwi-in (a concubine of King Cheoljong) were members of the royal family.

In 1834, the Jo clan seized control over the royal court from the Andong Kim clan. The clan rose to prominence, pushing out the Andong Kim clan that had wielded power since the King Sunjo regime. However, with the death of the clan leader Jo Man-yeong in 1846, control of the kingdom once again fell into the hands of the Andong Kim clan.

Anti-Catholic in nature, the Jo clan dominated the court when King Heonjeong blamed the Kim clan for being soft on Catholics and launched a persecution, killing hundreds of Catholics, including three French missionary priests.

Queen Sinjeong of the Pungyang Jo clan eventually took power as regent when her son Heonjong became king following the untimely death of Crown Prince Hyomyeong.

The Pungyang Jo clan saw that Yi Myeong-bok (later Emperor Gojong) was only twelve years old and would not be able to rule in his own name until he came of age, and that they could easily influence Yi Ha-eung, who would be acting as regent for the future king. As soon as news of Cheoljong's death reached Yi Ha-eung through his intricate network of spies in the palace, he and the Pungyang Jo clan took the hereditary royal seal — an object that was considered necessary for a legitimate reign to take place and aristocratic recognition to be received — effectively giving her absolute power to select the successor to the throne. By the time Cheoljong's death had become a known fact, the Andong Kim clan was powerless according to Royal law as the seal lay in the hands of the Grand Royal Dowager Queen Sinjeong.

When the Grand Queen Dowager stepped down from regency, Grand Internal Prince Heungseon had driven out the influence of the Jo clan. Which eventually brought in Queen Min’s intervention as she became involved in Royal politics. Thus bringing down the power of the king’s father and his supporters, and bringing in her family’s power, the Yeoheung Min clan.

Other connected members 
 Jo Gi-su - son-in-law of Grand Prince Inpyeong and grandson-in-law of King Injo and Queen Inryeol
Internal Princess Consort Pungchang - the stepmother of Queen Inhyeon
 Lady Jo - noblewoman author of Memoirs of Lady Jo of Pungyang
 Lady Jo - Queen Cheorin’s aunt
 Jo Jeong-gu - brother-in-law of Gojong of Korea, son-in-law of Grand Internal Prince Heungseon and Grand Internal Princess Consort Sunmok
 Jo Mu-kang - husband of Princess Sukhye, brother-in-law of Prince Yangwon, and son-in-law of King Seongjong

References 

Korean clan names of Chinese origin